The 1991–92 Tunisian National Championship season was the 66th season of top-tier football in Tunisia.

Results

League table

Result table

References
1991–92 Ligue 1 on RSSSF.com

Tunisian Ligue Professionnelle 1 seasons
1991–92 in Tunisian football
Tun